Duddepudi is a village in Eluru district in the state of Andhra Pradesh in India.

Demographics

As of the 2011 India census, Duddepudi has a population of 1235 of which 636 are males and 599 are females, making the average sex ratio 1 male for every 0.94 females. The child population is 129 which makes up 10.45% of the total population of the village. In 2011, the literacy rate of the village was 55.97%, about 11.05% lower than the average of the Andhra Pradesh.

References 

Villages in Eluru district